Elisir is the ninth studio album by Italian singer-songwriter Alice, released in late 1987 on EMI Music.

The album was recorded after the 1986/1987 European Park Hotel concert tour and includes new interpretations of six songs from the singer's earlier repertoire as performed on the tour, as well as the previously unreleased "Nuvole" ("Clouds") and a cover version of John Lennon and Paul McCartney's "The Fool on the Hill", released as the album's lead single. The Elisir was a commercial success in both Continental Europe and Scandinavia and was later awarded the prize Goldene Europa for sales on the West German market.

The track "Hispavox" was first released as "Rumba Rock" on the 1980 album Capo Nord.

Elisir was released with a revised track list under the title Kusamakura in Japan in 1988, then also including tracks from 1986's Park Hotel as well as the previously unreleased recording "Le scogliere di Dover".

Both "Il vento caldo dell'estate" and "I treni di Tozeur" were again re-recorded and included in the 2000 career retrospective Personal Jukebox.

Track listing
Side A
"Nuvole" (Alice, Tuni, Francesco Messina) – 5:13
 Previously unreleased recording.
"Il vento caldo dell'estate" (1987 version) (Alice, Franco Battiato, Giusto Pio) – 4:26
 Original version appears on 1980 album Capo Nord.
"Notte a Roma" (1987 version) (Alice) – 4:14
 Original version appears on 1983 album Falsi allarmi.
"Hispavox" (Alice, Franco Battiato, Giusto Pio) – 5:03
 Original version entitled "Rumba Rock" appears on 1980 album Capo Nord.

Side B
"I treni di Tozeur" (1987 solo version) (Franco Battiato, Saro Cosentino, Giusto Pio) – 4:23
 Original duet version with Franco Battiato released as single in 1984.
"The Fool on the Hill" (John Lennon, Paul McCartney) – 3:32
 Previously unreleased recording
"Una notte speciale" (1987 version) (Alice, Franco Battiato, Giusto Pio) – 4:40
 Original version appears on 1981 album Alice, also known as Per Elisa.
"La mano" (1987 version) (Alice) – 5:42
 Original version appears on 1982 album Azimut.

Personnel
 Alice – lead vocals, keyboard instruments
 Curt Cress – drums, percussion instruments
 Filippo Destrieri – keyboards, computer and drum machine
 Michele Fedrigotti – keyboards, Korg digital piano, synthesizer bass
 Marco Guarnerio – acoustic and electric guitars
 Francesco Messina – keyboard programming
 Marco Liverani – keyboards

Production
 Francesco Messina – record producer, musical arranger
 Marco Liverani – musical arranger
 Marco Guarniero – collaborator musical arrangements
 Michele Fedrigotti – musical supervisor
 Benedict Tobias Fenner – sound engineer
 Mixed by Benedict Tobias Fenner except "Notte a Roma" mixed by Marco Guarnerio
 Recorded and mixed at Logic Studio Milan in September and October 1987
 CDG Milano – digital editing
 Mastered at Abbey Road Studios, London
 Polystudio & EMI Creative Service – cover design
 Gik Piccardi – cover photography
 Gioi Ardessi – make-up
 Alessandro Paderni – tour photography

External links

1987 albums
Alice (singer) albums
EMI Records albums
Italian-language albums